"Save Today" is a song by South African rock band Seether. It was released on 22 September 2015 as the fourth single and final single from their sixth studio album Isolate and Medicate.

This song was inspired by Shaun Morgan's late brother Eugene who committed suicide by jumping out of a hotel window. Shaun said "When I began writing it, it was really simple, but I liked what it was inspiring in me as far as emotion and lyrics. I ran with that." "When we got in the studio with (producer) Brendan O'Brien, it became more interesting. He added some parts and made it prettier."

Charts

References

2014 songs
Seether songs
2015 singles
Songs written by Shaun Morgan
Songs written by Dale Stewart
Songs written by John Humphrey (drummer)
Song recordings produced by Brendan O'Brien (record producer)